Ryan Jarrett (born December 28, 1983, in Summerville, Georgia), is an American professional rodeo cowboy who specializes in tie-down roping and competes in the Professional Rodeo Cowboys Association (PRCA) circuit. At the 2005 National Finals Rodeo (NFR), he won the PRCA All-Around world championship. He competed in steer wrestling, tie-down roping, and team roping during the season and at the NFR to win the title.

He was inducted into the Rodeo Hall of Fame of the National Cowboy and Western Heritage Museum in 2010.

References

External links

Living people
1983 births
People from Summerville, Georgia
All-Around
Roping (rodeo)
Steer wrestlers
Sportspeople from Oklahoma
People from Comanche, Oklahoma